Li Jiexiang (born March 1964) is a former Chinese politician. He was investigated by China's top anti-graft agency in April 2022. Previously he served as vice chairman of Qinghai Provincial People's Congress and before that, executive vice governor of Qinghai. He is a representative of the 19th National Congress of the Chinese Communist Party.

Biography
Li was born in Jungar Banner, Inner Mongolia, in March 1964. In 1982, he entered Baotou Normal School, majoring in Chinese language and literature. After graduation in 1985, he stayed and worked at the school.

He joined the Chinese Communist Party (CCP) in January 1985, and got involved in politics in June 1986. He was vice mayor of Holingol in November 1994 and vice governor of Qingshan District in November 1997. He served as governor of Shiguai District from October 2000 to December 2002, and party secretary, the top political position in the district, from December 2002 to November 2003. Then he served as party secretary of Tumd Right Banner and chairman of its People's Congress. He became vice mayor and a member of the Standing Committee of the CCP Baotou Committee in September 2010 before being assigned to the similar position in Tongliao in August 2011. He was deputy director of the Development and Reform Commission of Inner Mongolia Autonomous Region and director of the Energy Development Bureau of Inner Mongolia Autonomous Region in May 2013, and held that office until April 2015. In April 2015, he was promoted to acting mayor of the capital city Hohhot, confirmed in January 2017. In May 2017, he was promoted again to become party secretary of Tongliao, and served until September 2019.

In September 2019, he was transferred to northwest China's Qinghai province, where he was appointed executive vice governor and was admitted to member of the standing committee of the CCP Qinghai Provincial Committee, the province's top authority. In January 2022, he was made vice chairman of Qinghai Provincial People's Congress.

Downfall
On 7 April 2022, he was put under investigation for alleged "serious violations of discipline and laws" by the Central Commission for Discipline Inspection (CCDI), the party's internal disciplinary body, and the National Supervisory Commission, the highest anti-corruption agency of China. On 19 September 2022, Li was expelled from the party over violations of Party discipline and laws.

References

1964 births
Living people
People from Ordos City
Cheung Kong Graduate School of Business alumni
Central Party School of the Chinese Communist Party alumni
People's Republic of China politicians from Inner Mongolia
Chinese Communist Party politicians from Inner Mongolia
Expelled members of the Chinese Communist Party